Mukund Harishkumar Parmar (born 13 November 1968) is an Indian former first-class cricketer who played for Gujarat. As of February 2016, he works as the head coach of Andhra.

Career
A right-handed middle-order batsman who bowled part-time slow left-arm orthodox, Parmar represented Gujarat for 19 seasons after making his debut at the age of 19 in 1988. He made a total of 6674 runs in first-class cricket at an average close to 50, and scored 20 centuries. He was successful with the bat in the 1990–91 Ranji Trophy, scoring 691 runs in four matches at 115.16 and four hundreds. Soon after, he became a regular member of the West Zone team and appeared for Wills XI. Parmar made three hundreds in three consecutive first-class innings during the 1995–96 Ranji Trophy, scoring 174 and 101 against Saurashtra followed by his personal best score of 283 against Maharashtra. He captained Gujarat in 47 matches during the latter part of his career, but was relatively less successful with the bat having made only four centuries in his last nine first-class seasons.

Parmar became a cricket coach after his playing career. After officiating in a few games as match referee in 2007, Parmar completed the NCA Level C course and became a batting consultant at the National Cricket Academy. In 2011/12 he worked as the chairman of the selection committee of the Gujarat Cricket Association. He was appointed as the head coach of Gujarat ahead of the 2012/13 season and Gujarat went on to win the 2012–13 Syed Mushtaq Ali Trophy. He coached the India under-23s in 2013 to victory in the ACC Emerging Teams Cup. During the 2014/15 season, he was made the head coach of Andhra.

References

External links 
 
 

1968 births
Living people
Indian cricketers
Gujarat cricketers
West Zone cricketers
Indian cricket coaches